The KASHISH Mumbai International Queer Film Festival (also known as Mumbai International Queer Film Festival and Mumbai International Queer Film Festival) is an annual LGBT event that has been held in Mumbai, India, since 2010. The film festival screens gay, lesbian, bisexual, transgender and queer films from India and around the world. It is voted as one of the top five LGBT film festivals in the world.

Background 

2009 was a historic year for the LGBT movement in India. On 2 July 2009, the Delhi High Court court ruling decriminalised homosexual intercourse between consenting adults and judged Section 377 of the Indian Penal Code to be conflicting with the fundamental rights guaranteed by the Constitution of India. This brought a respite to the Indian LGBT community that has been repressed and marginalized. This also led to open celebrations by LGBT persons including pride parades in many of the metros.

This was followed by the relaunch of India's first gay magazine, Bombay Dost. The Indian Election Commission decided to recognize transgender as a separate category. All these activities brought media focus and visibility to the LGBT community in India.

KASHISH Mumbai Queer Film Festival took this movement forward through the medium of films. It made LGBT persons, their desires and aspirations visible through films and brought about an international perspective to LGBT works. The objective of the festival continues to mainstream the LGBT community and project them as 'normal' human beings who have the capacity to love and live with dignity. The festival offers cinema as a means to understand what being queer means today, and how it impacts both the queer community and the society at large.

It was the first Indian LGBT film festival to be held in a mainstream theater. It was also the first LGBT film festival to obtain a clearance from the Ministry of Information and Broadcasting (India).

The festival 

KASHISH Mumbai International Queer Film Festival, 2010 was held between 22 and 25 April 2010, spread across two venues in Mumbai – one in the city and one in the suburbs. The first edition was organized by Solaris Pictures and The Humsafar Trust in association with Bombay Dost. Features, short films, documentaries and experimental films were screened that highlighted gay, lesbian, bisexual and transgender characters and stories. The films explored the diverse realities, complexities, joys and sorrows that make up the global queer experience. They also celebrated, reclaimed, and explained LGBTQ identities while engaging and entertaining audiences. The film festival brought together the audience, the films and their makers to create social change.

In its debut year, founder Festival Director Sridhar Rangayan said he hoped that the film festival would encourage greater visibility of queer cinema and bring it into the mainstream discourse. He has said that the festival showcases the films to both queer and mainstream audiences, in order to make them aware of queer thought, desires and expressions.

The festival boasts of support from Indian film personalities. Shyam Benegal is the Festival Patron. Celina Jaitly was the Festival Ambassador until 2020.

The advisory board of the festival is composed of eminent personalities like Aruna Raje Patil, Dolly Thakore, Meghna Ghai Puri, Onir, Renuka Shahane and Roy Wadia. In the past years Nandini Sardesai, Shernaz Patel and Jenni Olson (USA) also served on the advisory board.

Some of the chief guests and guests of honour at the festival have been Sir Ian McKellen, Sonam Kapoor, Arjun Kapoor, Konkana Sen Sharma, Nawazuddin Siddiqui, Rajkumar Rao, Swara Bhaskar, Divya Dutta, Pratik Gandhi, Ranveer Brar, Shalmali, Pooja Bhatt, Nisa Godrej, Anupam Kher, Kunal Kapoor, Juhi Chawla, Manisha Koirala, Nandita Das, Sai Paranjpye, Kabir Bedi, Kalpana Lajmi, Zeenat Aman, Moushumi Chatterjee, Onir, Tanuja Chandra, Neeraj Ghaywan, Sanjay Suri, Neelam Kothari, Varun Badola, Shweta Kawatra, Sona Mohapatra, Anant Mahadevan, Dalip Tahil, Shaina NC, Aleque Padamsee, Apurva Asrani, Suchitra Pillai-Malik, Purab Kohli, Adhuna Bhabani, Prince Manvendra Singh Gohil, and Laxmi Narayan Tripathi.

KASHISH since 2010 to 2016 has been organized by Solaris Pictures and co-organized by The Humsafar Trust. 
Since 2017, KASHISH is organized by KASHISH Arts Foundation, in association with Solaris Pictures.

Calendar
 The 1st edition of the festival was held in April 2010 at PVR Cinemas and screened 110 films from 25 countries. Its theme was 'See A Different World'.
 The 2nd edition of the festival was held in May 2011 at Cinemax Versova & Alliance Francaise de Bombay, and screened 124 films from 23 countries. Its theme was 'Bigger, Bolder & Queerer'.
 The 3rd edition of the festival was held in May 2012 at Cinemax Versova & Alliance Francaise de Bombay, and screened 120 films from 30 countries. Its theme was 'For Everyone'.
 The 4th edition of the festival was held in May 2013 at Cinemax Versova & Alliance Francaise de Bombay, and screened 132 films from 40 countries. Its theme was 'Towards Change'.
 The 5th edition of the festival was held in May 2014 at Liberty Cinema & Alliance Francaise de Bombay, and screened 154 films from 31 countries. Its theme was 'Dare To Dream'.
 The 6th edition of the festival was held in May 2015 at Liberty Cinema, Alliance Francaise de Bombay & Max Mueller Bhavan, and screened 180 films from 44 countries. Its theme was 'Reaching Out, Touching Hearts'.
 The 7th edition of the festival was held in May 2016 at Liberty Cinema, Alliance Francaise de Bombay & Max Mueller Bhavan, and screened 182 films from 53 countries. Its theme was '7 Shades of Love'.
 The 8th edition of festival was held in May 2017 at Liberty Cinema & Alliance Francaise de Bombay, and screened 147 films from 45 countries. Its theme was 'Diverse, One'.
 The 9th edition of festival was held in May 2018 at Liberty Carnival Cinemas & Metro INOX, and screened 140 films from 45 countries. Its theme was 'Together, With Pride'.
The 10th edition of festival was held in June 2019 at Liberty Carnival Cinemas & Metro INOX, and screened 160 films from 43 countries. Its theme was 'Over The Rainbow'.
The 11th edition of festival was held online in July 2020 and screened 157 films from 42 countries. Its theme was 'Moving Forward, Together'.
The 12th edition of festival was held online in August/September, 2021 and screened 221 films from 53 countries. Its theme was 'Unlock With Pride'.
The 13th edition of festival was held as a physical festival from June 1–5, 2022 at Liberty Cinema and Alliance Francaise de Bombay and as an online festival from June 3–12, 2022; and screened 184 films from 53 countries. Its theme was 'Flights for Freedom'.

Festival jury

KASHISH Mumbai International Queer Film Festival has, in its attempt to mainstream queer visibility, engages a jury panel to judge the award categories. The jury has consisted of actors, directors, critics, theater and media personalities and festival curators from India and abroad.

Wendell Rodricks, celebrity fashion designer, has been the judge every year from 2012 to 2020 of the KASHISH Poster Design Contest that invites designers from around the world to create the look of the festival, which will be used in posters, billboards and other promotional materials. Since 2020, after passing away of Wendell Rodricks, his husband Jerome Marrel is the judge.

Awards

Best Narrative Feature Film
2022: Naanu Ladies - Shailaja Padindala | India, UK
2021: Forgotten Roads - Nicol Ruiz | Chile
2020: Music For The Bleeding Hearts - Rafael Gomes | Brazil
2019: Jose - Li Cheng | Guatemala
2018: Mater - Pablo D’Alo Abba | Argentina
2017: Gloria and Grace - Flávio R. Tambellini | Brazil
2016: How To Win At Checkers (Every Time) - Josh Kim | Thailand, USA, Indonesia
2015: Boys (Jongens) - Mischa Kamp | The Netherlands
2014: Tru Love - Kate Johnston and Shauna MacDonald | Canada
2013: Morgan - Michael Akers | USA
2012: My Last Round (Mi Ultimo Rounde) - Julio Jorquera Arriagada | Chile
2011: I Am - Onir | India

Best Documentary Feature Film
2022: LA Queencianera - Pedro Peira | Mexico, USA
2021: Canela - Cecilia del Valle  | Argentina
2020: One Taxi Ride - Mak CK | Mexico
2019: Until Porn Do Us Part - Jorge Pelicano | Portugal
2018: Boys For Sale - Itako | Japan
2017: No Dress Code Required - Cristina Herrera Bórquez | Mexico
2016: Pansy - Jean-Baptiste Erreca | France
2015: Do I Sound Gay? - David Thorpe | USA
2014: Bridegroom - Linda Bloodworth-Thomason | USA
2013: Hide and Seek - Saadat Munir | Pakistan, Denmark
2012: Let The Butterflies Fly (Chittegalu Haradali) - Gopal Menon | India
2011: We Were Here - David Weissman | USA
2010: Prodigal Sons - Kimberly Reed | USA

Best Documentary Short Film
2022: Beirut Dreams In Colour - Michael Collins | Lebanon, USA
2021: Tracing Utopia - Nick Tyson & Catarina de Sousa  | Portugal
2020: Breakwater - Cris Lyra | Brazil
2019: Laadli - Sudipto Kundu | India
2018: Little Potato - Wes Hurley | USA, Russia
2017: Naked Wheels - Rajesh James | India
2016: Transindia - Meera Darji | India, UK 
2015: Novena - Anna Rodgers | Ireland
2014: Families Are Forever - Vivian Kleiman | USA 
2013: Two Girls Against The Rain - Sopheak Sao | Cambodia
2012: Are We So Different (Aamra Ki Etoi Bhinno) - Lok Prakash | Bangladesh
2011: Bullied - Bill Brummel and Geoffrey Sharp | UK
2010: XXWHY - Dr.Bharathy Manjula | India

Best International Narrative Short Film
2022: Warsha - Dania Bdeir | Lebanon
2021: Snake - Andrej Volkashin | Macedonia
2020: Touchscreen - Arthur Halpern | USA
2019: Our Way Back - Moshe Rosenthal | Israel
2018: Marguerite - Marianne Farley | Canada
2017: Stay - Milka Mircic Martinovic | Germany
2016: San Cristóbal -  Omar Zuniga Hidalgo | Chile
2015: 09:55 - 11:05 Ingrid Ekman Bergsgatan 4b - Cristine Berglund and Sophie Vukovic | Sweden
2014: Naked - José Antonio Cortés Amunarriz | Spain
2013: Polaroid Girl - April Maxey | USA
2012: Through The Window (Me’ever La’chalon) - Chen Shumowitz | Israel
2011: Let The World Know About Me - Marianna Giordano | Argentina
2010: Steam - Eldar Rapaport | USA

Best Indian Narrative Short Film
2022: Muhafiz - Pradipta Ray | India
2021: Are We There Yet? - Bhanu Babbal & Kashyap Swaroop | India
2020: The Song We Sang - Aarti Neharsh | India
2019: The Booth - Rohin Ravendran Nair | India
2018: Ajay - Vikrant Dhote | India
2017: Maacher Jhol (Fish Curry) - Abhishek Verma | India
2016: Daarvatha (The Threshold) - Nishant Roy Bombarde | India
2015: Sundar - Rohan Kanawade | India and Mudivai Thaedum Muttrupulli (A Full Stop That Searches For Its End) - Vivek Vishwanathan | India
2014: Mitraa - Ravi Jadhav | India
2013: Urmi - Jehangir Jani | India
2012: The jury decided not to award any film in this category.
2011: Amen - Judhajit Bagchi and Ranadeep Bhattacharyya  | India
2010: Lost & Found - Shrenik Jain | India

Riyad Wadia Award For Best Emerging Indian Filmmaker
2022: Nemil Shah for Dal Bhat | India
2021: Radhika Prasidhha for Begum Parvathi| India
2020: Arun Fulara for Sunday
2019: Sugandha Bansal for A Little More Blue
2018: Preet for Gray
2017: Rajesh James for Naked Wheels and Vishal Srivastava for Selfhood (Wajood)
2016: Vikrant Dhote and Srikant Ananthakrishnan for Any Other Day
2015: Vaibhav Hatkar for Ek Maaya Ashi Hi (A Love Such As This)
2014: Sharon Flynn for I'dentity
2013: Manava Naik for Dopehri  and Rohan Kanawade for Lonely Walls (Ektya Bhinti)
2012: Pradipta Ray for The Night Is Young (Raat Baaki) 
2011: Shumona Banerjee for The Flower Bud (Kusum)

Best Performance in a Lead Role
2022: Yu Ishizuka for The Fish With One Sleeve | Japan
2021: Maria Eduardo Maia for Advent of Mary| Brazil
2020: Benjamin Daimary for Fireflies (Jonaki Porua) | India
2019: Felix Maritaud for Sauvage | France
2018: Chetan Kanwar in Pashi | India
2017: Petrice Jones in Play The Devil | Trinidad & Tobago
2016: Ingkarat Damrongsakkul in How To Win At Checkers (Every Time) | Thailand, USA, Indonesia
2015: Kristina Hernandez in Stealth | USA
2014: Kate Trotter in Tru Love | Canada
2013: Crystal Annette in Polaroid Girl | USA

Best Screenplay
2022: Muhafiz written by Pradipta Ray and Ashutosh Pathak | India  
2021: The Man With The Answers written by Stelios Kammitsis | Cyprus, Greece, Italy  
2019: Music For The Bleeding Hearts written by Rafael Gomes | Brazil
2019: Jose written by Li Cheng | Guatemala

Best Student Short Film
2022: The Third Solar Term - Zhanfei Song | China, UK
2021: On A Path - Lihi Lubetkin | Israel
2020: The Summer of 12 - Kuan-Ling Kuo | Taiwan
2019: Three - Lior Soroka | Israel
2018: Celebrate Eileen - Judith Westermann | Germany
2017: Still Devout - Melissa Perez | USA

KASHISH QDrishti Film Grant
2021: Bhargav Lahkar for The Caress | India
2020: Arun Fulara for My Mother's Girlfriend | India
2019: Rohin Raveendran Nair for The Booth and Sudipto Kundu for Laadli
2018: Siddharth Chauhan for Pashi | India
2017: Debadrita Bose for Clarinets (Shehenaiiya) | India
2016: V. Ramanathan for Normalcy | India

Special Jury Mention
2022: Wet Sand - Elene Naveriani | Georgia, Switzerland (in the category Narrative Feature)
2022: Coming To You - Gyuri Byun | South Korea (in the category Documentary Feature)
2022: Marcel - Gastón Calivari | Argentina (in the category Documentary Short)
2022: Dal Bhat - Nemil Shah | India (in the category Indian Narrative Short)
2022: Breathe - Harm van der Sanden | Netherlands (in the category International Narrative Short)
2022: The Fish With One Sleeve - Tsuyoshi Shôji | Japan (in the category International Narrative Short)
2022: Mazel Tov - Eli Zuzovsky | Israel (in the category Student Short)
2022: Sagar Minde for Her Canvas | India (in the category Riyad Wadia Award for Best Indian Emerging Filmmaker)
2022: Anureet Watta for Kinaara | India (in the category Riyad Wadia Award for Best Indian Emerging Filmmaker)
2021: Rebel Dykes - Harri Shanahan & Siân A. Williams | UK (in the category Best Documentary Feature)
2021: Nothing But A Human - Swati Jaiswal | India (in the category Best Documentary Short) 
2021: Keep Punching - Kirnay Bhatt | India (in the category Best Indian Narrative Short) 
2021: Stray Dogs Come Out At Night - Humza Bangash | Pakistan (in the category Best International Narrative Short) 
2021: Today - Francis Chillet | France (in the category Best Student Short) 
2020: March For Dignity - John Eames | UK, Georgia (in the category Best Documentary Feature)
2020: My Brother Is A Mermaid - Alfie Dale | UK (in the category Best International Narrative Short)
2020: We Are Dancers - Joe Morris | UK (in the category Best International Narrative Short)
2020: Neon Hearts - Ana Jakimska | Macedonia, the former Yugoslav Republic of (in the category Best Student Short)
2019: Amruta Shubhash in The Booth | India  (in the category Best Performance in a Lead Role)
2019: Parna Pethe in The Booth | India  (in the category Best Performance in a Lead Role)
2019: Lior Ashkenazi in Our Way Back | Israel  (in the category Best Performance in a Lead Role)
2019: Shaadi Ke Kapde - Sonal Giani | India  (in the category Riyad Wadia Award for Best Emerging Indian Filmmaker)
2019: Rangeen - Shaikh Ayaz | India  (in the category Riyad Wadia Award for Best Emerging Indian Filmmaker)
2019: Hands & Wings - Sungbin Byun | Republic of Korea (in the category Best Student Short)
2019: Prisoner Of Society - Rati Tsiteladze | Georgia (in the category Best Documentary Short)
2019: Visibles - Enrique Rey | Spain (in the category Best Documentary Short)
2019: Fifth Floor On The Left - Renata Lucic | Croatia (in the category Best Screenplay)
2018: Birds Of Paradise - Rahul MM | India (in the category Riyad Wadia Award for Best Emerging Indian Filmmaker)
2018: Sunken Plum - Gu Xiang | China (in the category Best Performance in a Lead Role)
2018: Sunken Plum - Roberto F. Canuto & Xiaoxi Xu | China (in the category Best International Narrative Short Film)
2018: Goldfish - Yorgos Angelopoulos | Greece (in the category Best International Narrative Short Film)
2018: Mathias - Clara Stern | Austria (in the category Best Student Short Film)
2017: Beautiful Figure - Hajni Kis | The Netherlands (in the category Best Student Short Film)
2016: Beautiful Something - Brian Sheppard | USA (in the category Best Performance in a Lead Role)
2016:  Antonio Altamirano San Cristóbal | Chile (in the category Best Performance in a Lead Role)
2016: Trade Queen - David Wagner | Germany (in the category Best International Narrative Short Film)
2016: Technical Difficulties of Intimacy - Joel Moffett | USA (in the category Best International Narrative Short Film)
2016: That's My Boy - Akhil Satyan | India (in the category Riyad Wadia Award for Best Emerging Indian Filmmaker)
2012: We The Outsiders... (Aamhi Ka Tisre...) - Ramesh Laxman More | India (in the category Riyad Wadia Award for Best Emerging Indian Filmmaker)
2010: Holding Hands - Tonnette Stanford and Katherine Wilkinson | Australia (in the category International Narrative Short)
2010: Flying Inside My Body - Sushmit Ghosh, Rintu Thomas, Sumit Sharma and Ajeeta Chowhan | India (in the category Documentary Short)
2010: Speak Up! It is Not My Fault - Deepika Lal | India (in the category Documentary Short)
2010: Dirty Magazines - Jay Levy | USA (in the category International Narrative Short)
2010: I Am Gay (Jag Ar Bog) - Nicolos Kolovos | Sweden (in the category International Narrative Short)

Special Jury Award
2012: Rites of Passage - Jeff Roy | USA
2011: I Am - Sonali Gulati | USA

KASHISH Coffee Break Audience Award
2013 onwards this competition was not held.
2012: Logging Out - Nakshatra Bagwe | India
2011: Nothing Happened - Julia Kots | USA

Best Poster Design
2021 : Ajoy Kumar Das | Mumbai, India
2020 : Joyston Moreira | London, UK
2019 : Domenico De Monte | Milan, Italy
2013 : Ashutosh Vyas | Mumbai, India
2017 : Benny Mathew | Mumbai, India
2016 : Ajoy Kumar Das | Mumbai, India
2015 : Niharika Rastogi | New Delhi, India
2014 : Punith Mahesh | Hyderabad, India
2013 : Prachi Patil-Kotkar | Mumbai, India
2012 : S Ayyappa | Vijayawada, India

KASHISH Rainbow Warrior Award
2019 : Hoshang Merchant | Hyderabad, India
2018 : Pawan Dhall | Kolkata, India
2017 : Laxmi Narayan Tripathi | Mumbai, India and Manavendra Singh Gohil | Rajpipla, India
2016 : Ruth Vanita | Montana, USA and (late) Saleem Kidwai| Lucknow, India
2015 : (late) Betu Singh | New Delhi, India
2014 : (late) Wendell Rodricks | Goa, India and Ashok Row Kavi | Mumbai, India

KASHISH Rainbow Champion Award
2019 : The Humsafar Trust

See also
 List of LGBT film festivals

References

External links 
 

Recurring events established in 2010
LGBT film festivals in India
2010 establishments in Maharashtra
Film festivals established in 2010
Film industry in Mumbai
Festivals in Mumbai
LGBT culture in Mumbai
Film festivals in Maharashtra